The 2020 Primera B de Chile, also known as Campeonato Juegaenlinea.com 2020, was the 66th season of the Primera B de Chile, Chile's second-tier football league. The competition began on 22 February 2020 and ended on 7 February 2021. Ñublense were the champions, winning their second Primera B title and earning promotion to the Chilean Primera División for the following season.

The competition was suspended from 18 March to 29 August 2020 due to the COVID-19 pandemic.

Format

The tournament was played by 15 teams, 14 returning from the previous season and the Segunda División Profesional champions San Marcos de Arica. The 15 teams played each other twice (once at home and once away) for a total of 28 matches, with one team having a bye day in each round. The team that finished in first place at the end of the round-robin tournament earned promotion to the Campeonato Nacional for the 2021 season as Primera B champions. Meanwhile, the teams finishing from second to sixth place played a playoff tournament for the second promotion berth, with the season runners-up having a bye to the final.

Since no teams were relegated at the end of the previous season, a weighted table that considered the performance of teams in the previous season as well as the current one was elaborated to decide relegation. The team finishing in bottom place of this table at the end of the season was relegated to the Segunda División Profesional.

Teams

Stadia and locations

Effects of the COVID-19 pandemic
On 16 March 2020, the Asociación Nacional de Fútbol Profesional (ANFP) announced the suspension of the Primera B as well as the rest of its tournaments due to the COVID-19 pandemic, starting from 18 March 2020.

On 8 June, ANFP's Council of Presidents decided to resume the league on 31 July with matches to be played behind closed doors and clubs having at least four weeks of training sessions, pending approval from the Chilean government. However, this original date had to be pushed back as clubs were only given approval to resume training sessions starting from 16 July, with the ANFP considering the weekend of 8 August as a new tentative date of resumption, following three weeks of training sessions.

On 19 August, in a press conference held at Estadio Nacional Julio Martínez Prádanos in Santiago, Chilean President Sebastián Piñera confirmed 29 August as the date of resumption of both the first and second tier seasons, with games to be played behind closed doors. The competition eventually resumed that day, with its fifth round of matches.

Standings

Results

Promotion playoff

Quarter-finals

Deportes Melipilla won 3–2 on aggregate and advanced to the semi-final.

Rangers won 2–0 on aggregate and advanced to the semi-final.

Semi-final

Deportes Melipilla won 3–1 on aggregate and advanced to the final.

Final

''Tied 1–1 on aggregate, Deportes Melipilla won on penalties and was promoted to the Chilean Primera División.

Top goalscorers

Source: Soccerway

Relegation
For this season, a weighted table was elaborated by computing an average of the points earned per game over this season and the previous one, with the average of points earned in the 2019 season weighted by 60% and the average of points earned in the 2020 season weighted by 40%. Promoted team San Marcos de Arica only had their points in the 2020 season averaged, without weighting. The team placed last in this table at the end of the season was relegated.

Source: ANFP

See also
 2020 Chilean Primera División

References

External links
Campeonato Primera B on ANFP's website

Primera B de Chile seasons
2020 in Chilean football
2020 in Chilean sport
Chile
Chile
2021 in Chilean football